The Twin Cities refers to the major riverside metropolitan areas of Minneapolis, Saint Paul and surrounding townships in Ramsey and Hennepin counties. In recent years, the Twin Cities has become home to a burgeoning comics scene, in the top ten for number of resident comics artists in the United States. The location of the Minneapolis College of Art and Design - one of the nation's first and only schools which offers both bachelor's and master's degrees in comic books (e.g.; 'BFA: Comic Art') - is likely a contributing factor. (See: MCAD) However, the global success of popular cartoonists like Minneapolis-born Charles M. Schulz must have paved the way.

List of artists
Artists who no longer live in the Twin Cities are noted for their most well-known work originating there. Many artists have moved to the area. Notable comic artists and cartoonists of the Twin Cities, and their achievements, include:

Diana Bledsoe - DBCartoons and gag cartoonist.
Ken Avidor - Roadkill Bill and editorial cartoonist.
Terry Beatty - artist for DC Comics' many Batman: The Animated Series spin-offs. Adjunct Faculty, MCAD Comics Department.
Big Time Attic - comic book firm of Zander Cannon and Kevin Cannon (no relation) Zander Cannon is well known for Smax, his work with Gene Ha on Top 10 and his breakout series The Replacement God (with Slave Labor Graphics and The Handicraft Guild). Kevin Cannon published a graphic novel Far Arden with Top Shelf Productions and self-published a compilation of Johnny Cavalier, his popular weekly strip for the Grinnell College newspaper. As Big Time Attic, the Cannons illustrated two books with Jim Ottaviani.
Paul Fricke - Author/Illustrator of Night of the Bedbugs, Comics artist of The Adventures in Odyssey Bible, two books on the Mille Lacs Band of Ojibwe and inker for DC's The Fly. Co-creator ofTrollords.
Neil Gaiman - comics legend, creator of Sandman and prize writer of DC Comics. Given "Defender of Liberty Award" by First Amendment champions Comic Book Legal Defense Fund (CBLDF).
Grant Gould - DC, Star Wars: Clone Wars web comic.
Terrance Griep, Jr - writer, DC, Image Comics. Co-creator of Johnny Cosmic.
Peter Gross - artist for DC Comics, Vertigo Comics Notable titles: Lucifer, Books of Magic, The Unwritten. Former Adjunct Faculty, MCAD Comics Department.
Sam Hiti - Xeric Foundation award winner for Tiempos Finales.
Christopher Jones - writer, illustrator DC Comics, Image Comics, Calibur Comics and others. Co-Founder of Minneapolis science fiction convention CONvergence.
Dan Jurgens - writer/penciller for DC Comics. Notable titles: Superman, Iron Fist and Thor.
Tom K - Trans-Atlantis series.
Roger Lootine - popular editorial strip Residue.
Doug Mahnke - DC, Dark Horse.
Michael May - comic writer.
Sarah Morean - cartoonist and zinester. Mini-Comics Editor for the independent comics site The Daily Cross Hatch. Coordinator of the Twin Cites Zinefest.
Tom Nguyen - illustrator DC Comics, Marvel Comics, comics magazine Wizard.
Tyler Page - popular fictionalized autobiography Stylish Vittles
Gordon Purcell - Star Trek comic adaptations.
Steve Sack - editorial and political cartoonist.
Zak Sally - Sammy the Mouse and Xeric Foundation award recipient, Visiting Artist Faculty, MCAD Comics Department.
Charles M. Schulz - creator of Peanuts
Barbara Schulz - cartoonist and inker for Devil's Due's Lovebunny and Mr. Hell, Micronauts, G.I. Joe, and DC's Books of Magic. Assistant Professor, MCAD Comics Department.
Paul Taylor - Wapsi Square.
Ursula Murray Husted - creator of graphic novels Making Rain, Looking Up, Drawing on Yourself, The Lions of Valletta and Vincent in Arles.  Assistant Professor Comics and Sequential Art, University of Wisconsin Stout.
Kristin Tipping - creator ofEvil Witch Allie and Bedtime Stories For Strangers.
Mike Toft - Brain Food.
Chaz Truog - Marvel, DC, Topps Comics.
Reed Waller - creator of popular adult strip Omaha the Cat Dancer.
Jason Walz - creator of the Eisner nominated graphic novel Homesick, A Story for Desmond, and Crap ShootKate Worley - main writer on Omaha the Cat Dancer, popular contributor to Wimmen’s Comix.
 Chris Monroe - creator of comic strip "Violet Days." Previously author of comic "The Invisible Fence." Children's book author.
M.S. Harkness - cartoonist and creator of the graphic novel Tinderella.

Peanuts Characters Sculpture Project

The Twin Cities is home to a notable outdoor sculpture project, featuring the characters from Charles M. Schulz's Peanuts comic strip. Throughout Minneapolis and Saint Paul, one can find artistic variations of Snoopy, Charlie Brown, Lucy, Woodstock and others. The first such project was called Charlie Brown Around Town'', featuring large three-dimensional copies of the character Charlie Brown in a joyful pose, and painted by various residents of the Twin Cities. Other characters from the strip soon followed.

References

American comics artists